A vivisector is one who engages in vivisection.

Vivisector may also refer to:
 Vivisector (Marvel Comics), a comic book superhero
 The Vivisector, a novel by Patrick White
 Vivisector: Beast Within, a first-person shooter video game